The men's triple jump event was part of the track and field athletics programme at the 1920 Summer Olympics. The competition was held from Thursday, August 19, 1920, to Saturday, August 21, 1920. Twenty-one triple jumpers from eight nations competed. No nation had more than 4 jumpers, suggesting the limit had been reduced from the 12 maximum in force in 1908 and 1912. The event was won by Vilho Tuulos of Finland, the nation's first medal in the triple jump. Sweden, which had swept the medals in 1912, took the next three places. Erik Almlöf became the third man to win two medals in the event, repeating his bronze performance from 1912.

Background

This was the sixth appearance of the event, which is one of 12 athletics events to have been held at every Summer Olympics. Two jumpers from the pre-war 1912 Games returned: bronze medalist Erik Almlöf of Sweden and fourth-place finisher Erling Vinne of Norway. 

Czechoslovakia made its first appearance in the event. The United States competed for the sixth time, having competed at each of the Games so far.

Competition format

The competition was described as two rounds at the time, but was more similar to the modern divided final. All athletes received three jumps initially. The top six after that received an additional three jumps to improve their distance, but the initial jumps would still count if no improvement was made.

Records

These were the standing world and Olympic records (in metres) prior to the 1920 Summer Olympics. Dan Ahearn set his world record while being a citizen of the United Kingdom of Great Britain and Ireland; at this Olympics he represented the United States.

No new world or Olympic records were set during the competition.

Schedule

Results

The best six triple jumpers qualified for the final.

References

Sources
 
 

Triple jump
Triple jump at the Olympics